Märta Torén (21 May 1925 – 19 February 1957) was a Swedish stage and film actress of the 1940s and 1950s.

Biography
Torén's father was a Swedish military officer, and for three years, during World War II, she was a secretary in the Swedish war office.

After studying at the Stockholm Royal Dramatic Theater's Royal Dramatic Training Academy, Torén began her career on the stage and from 1947 she appeared in films. She appeared on the cover of the June 13 issue of Life Magazine in 1949.

Torén appeared in 11 American film productions during her brief career. One of her roles was opposite Humphrey Bogart in Sirocco (1951), and she also co-starred with Dana Andrews in Assignment – Paris! (1952).

Death
On 17 February 1957 she performed in a stage play at the Alle Theater in Stockholm.  Later that evening, she became unconscious and was taken to the hospital.  On 19 February 1957, Torén died from a cerebral hemorrhage at the age of 31.

Filmography

References

External links

 
 

1925 births
1957 deaths
Actresses from Stockholm
Swedish film actresses
Swedish stage actresses
20th-century Swedish actresses 
Burials at Norra begravningsplatsen